Kredenbach is a constituent community of Kreuztal, Siegen-Wittgenstein, North Rhine-Westphalia, Germany.

It has a population of 1649 inhabitants.

History
Kredenbach was created from the two constituent communities Lohe and Kredenbach and the Wüstehof.

Kredenbach and the Wüstehof belonged formally to the Kirchspiel Netphen and from 1623 they belong to Ferndorf.
Through municipal reform on 1 January 1969 it was incorporated in Kreuztal.
Before that it belonged to the Amt Ferndorf.

Radio documentary
 Die guten Geister des kleinen Dorfes, Radio documentary from Thilo Schmidt on Deutschlandfunk Kultur – Deutschlandrundfahrt, 2. September 2018, 55 minutes (thiloschmidt.de; MP3; 50,8 MB)

References

External links
 Homepages von Kredenbacher Einrichtungen und Vereinen
 CVJM-Kredenbach
 Dorfgemeinschaft Kredenbach e.V
 Evangelische Gemeinschaft Kredenbach
 Förderverein GmZ Kredenbach e.V.
 Löschgruppe Kredenbach
 MGV "Germania" Kredenbach
 SGV-Abteilung Kredenbach-Lohe
 TV Kredenbach-Lohe 1887 e.V.
 SpVg. Kredenbach-Müsen 1977 e.V.

Towns in North Rhine-Westphalia
Siegen-Wittgenstein